Kay Stonham is a British actress, writer and academic.

Background
Stonham attended William Morris Senior High School in Walthamstow, East London, leaving in 1974. She then graduated from Rose Bruford College in 1977. Stonham has a master's degree in Screenwriting for Film and Television from Royal Holloway, University of London. She co-created and co-wrote series one and two of the BBC Radio 4 series Robin and Wendy's Wet Weekends, and was sole writer on series three and four. She took the part of Wendy Mayfield opposite collaborator on the first two series Simon Greenall as Robin Mayfield.

Career
She created the series Audio Diaries for Radio 4 which ran for three series from 1998 to 2001. This innovative mockumentary was ahead of its time in style and content.
As a performer she appeared in another mock documentary series People Like Us both in its Radio 4 and BBC 2 incarnations. She was also a contributor to other Radio 4 comedy shows including The Sunday Format, Dead Ringers and Week Ending. She won the Radio Light Entertainment Titheridge Award in 1995.

In 1995 she shared a Writers' Guild of Great Britain award with her co-writers for the television comedy series Harry Enfield and Chums.  Simon Greenall shared the same award. Other TV sketch shows she has written for include Alistair McGowan's Big Impression for BBC 1, and Alas Smith and Jones for BBC 2, The Sketch Show for ITV, Comedy Nation for BBC 2 and TV to Go for BBC 1.
She was a table writer on My Family in 2006.

Her work for children's and young peoples TV includes, Kerching for CBBC, Girls in Love for Granada Kids, and Grange Hill for Mersey Television. Dani's House for CBBC and Shaun the Sheep for Aardman Animation.

Teaching
She is a Teaching Fellow in Screenwriting at Worcester University. She also teaches screenwriting at the London Film School.

References

External links
 

Year of birth missing (living people)
Living people
Screenwriting instructors
British women television writers
21st-century British women writers
British television writers
British women screenwriters
English television writers
English screenwriters
English children's writers
21st-century British screenwriters
Academics of the University of Worcester